Seele Benjamin Ntai (born 1985) is a Basotho swimmer.

Career
Ntai first competed for Lesotho at the 2007 World Championships in Melbourne where he finished 113th in the 100 metre breaststroke in 1:31.58 and with Thabiso Baholo, Lehlohonolo Moromella and Boipelo Makhothi finished 29th in the 4 × 100 metre freestyle relay in 5:42.96. Four years later at the 2011 World Championships in Shanghai, Ntai finished 111th in the 50 metre freestyle in 32.74.

References

1985 births
Living people
Lesotho male swimmers
Male breaststroke swimmers
Lesotho male freestyle swimmers
Date of birth missing (living people)